Peter Steven Fischer is an American television writer and television producer, whose work includes Murder, She Wrote, which he co-created with Richard Levinson and William Link. He was also the executive producer of the series for the first seven seasons. He wrote 8 of the 22 episodes the first season. Fischer wrote or co-wrote nearly three dozen episodes of the show during its run.

Fischer also wrote for the television series Baretta and episodes of Columbo and Kojak. He created, produced and wrote for the NBC series The Eddie Capra Mysteries.  Fischer also wrote the 1991 television film Stranger at My Door and the 1996 television film Dead Man's Island.

Filmography

Films

Television

Novels

The Hollywood Murder Mysteries 
 Jezebel in Blue Satin (2010)
 We Don't Need no Stinking Badges (2011)
 Love Has Nothing to Do with It (2011)
 Everybody Wants an Oscar (2012)
 The Unkindness of Strangers (2012)
 Nice Guys Finish Dead (2013)
 Pray For Us Sinners (2013)
 Has Anybody Here Seen Wyckham? (2013)
 Eyewitness to Murder (2014)
 A Deadly Shoot in Texas (2016)
 Everybody Let's Rock (2016)
 A Touch of Homicide (2016)
 Some Like Em Dead (2016)
 Dead Men Pay No Debts (2016)
 Apple Annie and the Dude (2017)
 Till Death Us Do Part (2017)
 Cue the Crows (2017)
 Murder Aboard the Highland Rose (2018)
 Ashes to Ashes (2018)
 The Case of the Shaggy Stalker (2018)
 Warner's Last Stand (2018)
 The Man in the Raincoat (2019)

Other novels 
 The Blood of Tyrants (2009)
 The Terror of Tyrants (2010)
 Expendable: A Tale of Love and War (2015)

References

External links 

Profile at Hollywood.com

American male writers
American television writers
Television producers from California
Living people
1935 births
People from Pacific Grove, California
Screenwriters from California
American male television writers